The Malaysian Conservation Alliance for Tigers (MYCAT) is, according to the New Straits Times, "an alliance of non-governmental organisations comprising the Malaysian Nature Society (MNS), Traffic Southeast Asia, Wildlife Conservation Society-Malaysia Programme and WWF-Malaysia."  It also includes the Department of Wildlife and National Parks. 

They have estimated the number of tigers left in Malaysia to be between 250 and 340.  In 2007, they implemented a hotline to report tiger-related crimes, such as poaching.  In order to deter poaching, they organize "Cat Walks", a citizen patrol in danger zones.  In 2009, they planned to double the tiger population from 500 to 1000 by 2020, but they called this goal "unachievable" in 2014.

See also 
 Malayan tiger
 Animal welfare and rights in Malaysia

References

External links
 Official website

Cat conservation organizations
Nature conservation in Malaysia
Animal welfare organisations based in Malaysia
Organizations established in 2003
2003 establishments in Malaysia